A weak base is a base that, upon dissolution in water, does not dissociate completely, so that the resulting aqueous solution contains only a small proportion of hydroxide ions and the concerned basic radical, and a large proportion of undissociated molecules of the base.

pH, Kb, and Kw
Bases yield solutions in which the hydrogen ion activity is lower than it is in pure water, i.e., the solution is said to have a pH greater than 7.0 at standard conditions, potentially as high as 14 (and even greater than 14 for some bases). The formula for pH is:

Bases are proton acceptors; a base will receive a hydrogen ion from water, H2O, and the remaining H+ concentration in the solution determines pH. A weak base will have a higher H+ concentration than a stronger base because it is less completely protonated than a stronger base and, therefore, more hydrogen ions remain in its solution. Given its greater H+ concentration, the formula yields a lower pH value for the weak base. However, pH of bases is usually calculated in terms of the OH− concentration. This is done because the H+ concentration is not a part of the reaction, whereas the OH− concentration is. The pOH is defined as:

If we multiply the equilibrium constants of a conjugate acid (such as NH4+) and a conjugate base (such as NH3) we obtain:

As  is just the self-ionization constant of water, we have 

Taking the logarithm of both sides of the equation yields:

Finally, multiplying both sides by -1, we obtain:

A weak base persists in chemical equilibrium in much the same way as a weak acid does, with a base dissociation constant (Kb) indicating the strength of the base. For example, when ammonia is put in water, the following equilibrium is set up:

A base that has a large Kb will ionize more completely and is thus a stronger base. As shown above, the pH of the solution, which depends on the H+ concentration, increases with increasing OH− concentration; a greater OH− concentration means a smaller H+ concentration, therefore a greater pH. Strong bases have smaller H+ concentrations because they are more fully protonated, leaving fewer hydrogen ions in the solution. A smaller H+ concentration means a greater OH− concentration and, therefore, a greater Kb and a greater pH.

NaOH (s) (sodium hydroxide) is a stronger base than (CH3CH2)2NH (l) (diethylamine) which is a stronger base than NH3 (g) (ammonia). As the bases get weaker, the smaller the Kb values become.

Percentage protonated
As seen above, the strength of a base depends primarily on pH. To help describe the strengths of weak bases, it is helpful to know the percentage protonated-the percentage of base molecules that have been protonated. A lower percentage will correspond with a lower pH because both numbers result from the amount of protonation. A weak base is less protonated, leading to a lower pH and a lower percentage protonated.

The typical proton transfer equilibrium appears as such:

B represents the base.

In this formula, [B]initial is the initial molar concentration of the base, assuming that no protonation has occurred.

A typical pH problem
Calculate the pH and percentage protonation of a .20 M aqueous solution of pyridine, C5H5N. The Kb for C5H5N is 1.8 x 10−9.

First, write the proton transfer equilibrium:

The equilibrium table, with all concentrations in moles per liter, is

This means .0095% of the pyridine is in the protonated form of C5H5NH+.

Examples
 Alanine
 Ammonia, NH3
 Methylamine, CH3NH2
 Ammonium hydroxide, NH4OH

Simple Facts
An example of a weak base is ammonia. It does not contain hydroxide ions, but it reacts with water to produce ammonium ions and hydroxide ions.
The position of equilibrium varies from base to base when a weak base reacts with water. The further to the left it is, the weaker the base.
When there is a hydrogen ion gradient between two sides of the biological membrane, the concentration of some weak bases are focused on only one side of the membrane. Weak bases tend to build up in acidic fluids. Acid gastric contains a higher concentration of weak base than plasma. Acid urine, compared to alkaline urine, excretes weak bases at a faster rate.

See also
 Strong base
 Weak acid

References

External links
 Guide to Weak Bases from Georgetown course notes
 Article on Acidity of Solutions of Weak Bases from Intute

Bases (chemistry)